Binley is a village in Hampshire, England. The village lies near the A34 road between Whitchurch and Stockbridge.

Governance
The village is part of the civil parish of St. Mary Bourne and is part of the Burghclere, Highclere and St. Mary Bourne ward of Basingstoke and Deane borough council. The borough council is a Non-metropolitan district of Hampshire County Council.

References 

Villages in Hampshire